Rautio is a village in Finland.  The term may also refer to:

Rautio (surname)

See also
Rautio Nunatak